The Lastours Formation is a geologic formation in France. It preserves fossils dating back to the Cambrian period.

See also

 List of fossiliferous stratigraphic units in France

References
 

Cambrian System of Europe
Cambrian France
Cambrian southern paleotemperate deposits